Soumah is a surname. Notable people with the surname include:

Abdoulaye Soumah (born 1985), Guinean footballer
Alhassane Soumah (born 1996), Guinean footballer
Amara Soumah (born 1990), Guinean footballer
Fodé Soumah, Guinean politician
Ibrahima Sory Soumah (born 1995), Guinean footballer
Issiaga Soumah (born 1974), Guinean footballer
M'mah Soumah (born 1985), Guinean judoka
Momo Wandel Soumah (born 1926), Guinean singer, composer and saxophonist
Morlaye Soumah (born 1971), Guinean footballer
Naby Soumah (born 1985), Guinean footballer
Ndèye Fatou Soumah (born 198), Senegalese sprinter
Noël Soumah (born 1994), Senegalese footballer
Richard Soumah (born 1986), Guinean footballer
Seydouba Soumah (born 1991), Guinean footballer
Soriba Soumah (1946–2004), Guinean footballer

References